The Battle of Épehy was a battle of the First World War fought on 18 September 1918, involving the British Fourth Army under the command of General Henry Rawlinson against German outpost positions in front of the Hindenburg Line. The village of Épehy was captured on 18 September by the 12th (Eastern) Division.

Prelude
Field Marshal Sir Douglas Haig, Commander-in-Chief (C-in-C) of the British Expeditionary Force (BEF) on the Western Front, was not eager to carry out any offensives, until the assault on the Hindenburg Line, influenced by mounting British losses from previous battles that year, over  since March,  them in the past six weeks. Rawlinson was kept reined in and advised by Haig to ensure his men were well rested for the eventual attack on the Line. When news arrived of the British Third Army's victory at the Battle of Havrincourt, Haig's mind was changed. On the day following the success at Havrincourt, 13 September, Haig approved Rawlinson's plan to clear German outpost positions on the high ground before the Hindenburg Line and preparations began.

Battle
Very few tanks could be provided for the attack, so an artillery barrage would have to be relied upon to prepare the way. But in the interests of surprise, they would not be able to provide a preliminary bombardment. The  would instead fire concentration shots at zero hour and support the infantry with a creeping barrage;  were also made available. All three corps of the Fourth Army were to take part, with V Corps of the Third Army on their left flank and on their right the French First Army (under Marie Eugène Debeney). The German 2nd Army and 18th Army defended the area.

On 18 September at 5.20 am, the attack opened and the troops advanced. The promised French assistance did not arrive, resulting in limited success for IX Corps on that flank. On the left flank, III Corps also found difficulty when attacking the fortifications erected at "the Knoll", Quennemont and Guillemont farms, which were held determinedly by German troops, the village was however captured by the British 12th Eastern Division (7th Norfolk, 9th Essex and 1st Cambridge). In the centre, General John Monash's two Australian divisions achieved complete and dramatic success.

However, during the battle, all but one member of "D" Company of the 1st Australian Battalion refused to take part in an attack to help a neighbouring British unit. The protest was against the battalion being sent back into combat when it had been about to be relieved. On 21 September 119 members of the company were subsequently imprisoned for desertion; this was the AIF's largest incidence of "combat refusal" during the war and formed part of a general weakening in the force's discipline due to the stresses of prolonged combat. The charges of desertion in the face of the enemy (a crime that could mean execution by firing squad in World War I) were reduced to the lesser crime of being AWOL. All bar one soldier had their charges dropped after the armistice in November.

Aftermath
Although Épehy was not a massive success, it signalled an unmistakable message that the Germans were weakening and it encouraged the Allies to take further action with the Battle of St. Quentin Canal, before the Germans could consolidate their positions. The failure of the III Corps to take their last objective – the outpost villages, would mean that the American forces would face a difficult task due to a hurried attack prior to the battle.

The nearby cemetery of Épehy Wood Farm Cemetery also holds the graves of men who died in this battle and the previous battles around this area.

Notes
  – The British and Australian official histories both state an Australian strength of  Major-General Sir Archibald Montgomery's The Story of the Fourth Army, written apparently with access to British Army documents states different figures;  infantry engaged,  taken,  captured and casualties of  The former figure has been used in this article but the difference should be noted.

References

Published References
 A. G. Butler (1940). Official History of the Australian Army Medical Services 1914–1918.
 Les Carlyon (2006). The Great War.

External links

Conflicts in 1918
1918 in France
Epehy
Epehy
Epehy
Epehy
Epehy
Battle honours of the King's Royal Rifle Corps
September 1918 events